The 1969–70 season was the 15th in the history of the European Cup, a club football tournament organised by UEFA for the domestic league champions of its member associations. It was won by Feyenoord of the Netherlands, who beat Scottish club Celtic after extra time in the final at San Siro in Milan on 6 May 1970. It was the first time the title had been won by a club from the Netherlands, and sparked a period of Dutch dominance in the competition, as Ajax won the next three titles. For this season, tiebreaker playoffs were abandoned in favour of the away goals rule; if both teams had scored the same number of away goals, one side was eliminated by the toss of a coin, something that was required in two of the matches (marked on the table below by "c/t").

Milan, the defending champions, were eliminated by Feyenoord in the second round.

Bracket

Preliminary round

|}

First leg

Second leg

Kjøbenhavns Boldklub won 5–0 on aggregate.

First round

|}

First leg

Second leg

Spartak Trnava won 6–2 on aggregate.

Galatasaray won 5–2 on aggregate.

Legia Warsaw won 10–1 on aggregate.

Saint-Étienne won 3–2 on aggregate.

Vorwärts Berlin won 3–1 on aggregate.

Red Star Belgrade won 12–2 on aggregate.

Milan won 8–0 on aggregate.

Feyenoord won 16–2 on aggregate.

Standard Liège won 4–1 on aggregate.

Real Madrid won 14–1 on aggregate.

Leeds United won 16–0 on aggregate.

Ferencváros won 5–3 on aggregate.

Celtic won 2–0 on aggregate.

Benfica won 5–2 on aggregate.

Dynamo Kyiv won 5–2 on aggregate.

Fiorentina won 3–1 on aggregate.

Second round

|}

First leg

Second leg

1–1 on aggregate; Galatasaray progressed on a coin toss.

Legia Warsaw won 3–1 on aggregate.

4–4 on aggregate; Vorwärts Berlin won on away goals.

Feyenoord won 2–1 on aggregate.

Standard Liège won 4–2 on aggregate.

Leeds United won 6–0 on aggregate.

3–3 on aggregate; Celtic progressed on a coin toss.

Fiorentina won 2–1 on aggregate.

Quarter-finals

|}

First leg

Second leg

Legia Warsaw won 3–1 on aggregate.

Feyenoord won 2–1 on aggregate.

Leeds United won 2–0 on aggregate.

Celtic won 3–1 on aggregate.

Semi-finals

|}

First leg

Second leg

Feyenoord won 2–0 on aggregate.

Celtic won 3–1 on aggregate.

Final

Top scorers
The top scorers from the 1969–70 European Cup (excluding preliminary round) are as follows:

Notes

References

External links
1969–70 All matches – season at UEFA website
European Cup results at Rec.Sport.Soccer Statistics Foundation
 All scorers 1969–70 European Cup (excluding preliminary round) according to protocols UEFA
1969-70 European Cup - results and line-ups (archive)
 European Cup 1969-70 – results, protocols, players statistics
 website eurocups-uefa.ru European Cup 1969-70 – results, protocols
 website Football Archive 1969–70 European Cup

1969–70 in European football
European Champion Clubs' Cup seasons